Trimaster was a Japanese scale model manufacturer based at Fujieda City, active from 1987 to 1991.

The company focused exclusively on the Luftwaffe aircraft in 1:48 scale, mostly rare variants and prototypes. Trimaster's kits were among the most detailed and complex at the time, including white metal castings, metal tubes, wires, vinyl tires and photo etched parts. Their prices were also extremely high for the time (about 55 USD) and the company went out of business as a result.

Hong Kong based Dragon acquired Trimaster's molds and re-released the kits in a simpler and more affordable format, replacing most metal parts with plastic. Lettering of the Dragon's "Master Series" resembles the original Trimaster's logo font.

In March 2020, Dragon announced its Trimaster Collection. This series, reissued in original box design, commemorates Trimaster's importance and its past contributions.

Products 

MA-1 Focke-Wulf Fw 190D-9 "Langnasen Dora"
MA-2 Focke-Wulf Fw 190D-12
MA-3 Heinkel He 162A-2 (with BMW 003E engine)
MA-4 Heinkel He 162A-2 (without engine)
MA-5 Focke-Wulf Fw 190F-8
MA-6 Focke-Wulf Fw 190A-8
MA-7 Focke-Wulf Fw 190A-8/R11 Nachtjäger
MA-8 Focke-Wulf Fw 190A-8/R8 Rammjäger
MA-9 Focke-Wulf Ta 152H-1
MA-10 Messerschmitt Me 262A-1a/U4 (Polkzerstörer with 50mm cannon)
MA-11 Messerschmitt Me 262A-2a/U2 (Schnellbomber with clear nose)
MA-12 Messerschmitt Me 262A-1a/Jabo
MA-13 Messerschmitt Me 163B-1a Komet
MA-14 Messerschmitt Me 163S (two-seat trainer)
MA-15 Focke-Wulf Fw 190D-12 Torpedoflugzeug
MA-16 Messerschmitt Me 262A-1a Nachtjäger (single seat)
MAZ6800 Focke-Wulf Ta 152C-0 (resin parts for nose and wings)

References

External links 
 Trimaster at Scalemates

Model manufacturers of Japan
Defunct companies of Japan
Toy companies established in 1987
Manufacturing companies disestablished in 1991
Japanese companies disestablished in 1991
Japanese companies established in 1987